The North British Review was a Scottish periodical. It was founded in 1844 to act as the organ of the new Free Church of Scotland, the first editor being David Welsh. It was published until 1871; in the last few years of its existence it had a liberal Catholic editorial policy.

Under Lord Acton's influence the Review took on a different character, with Aurelio Buddeus and Constantin Frantz writing on European affairs. Its editorial line rose above nationalistic politics, and was strongly opposed to Otto von Bismarck.

Editors
1845–6 Edward Francis Maitland
1847 William Hanna
1850–7 Alexander Campbell Fraser
1857 John Duns
1860–3 William Garden Blaikie
c.1864 David Douglas; publisher in 1868–9.
1869 Thomas Frederick Wetherell, for a group around Lord Acton.

References

1844 establishments in Scotland
1871 disestablishments in Scotland
Defunct literary magazines published in the United Kingdom
Magazines established in 1844
Magazines disestablished in 1871
Literary magazines published in Scotland